VIP is a song by French-Malian singer Aya Nakamura. It was released on 21 September 2022.

Compositions
"VIP" was written by Aya Nakamura and produced by Vladimir Boudnikoff.

Charts

References

 

2022 songs
2022 singles
Aya Nakamura songs
Songs written by Aya Nakamura